Vapenvallen  is a football stadium in Huskvarna, Sweden and the home stadium for the football team Husqvarna FF. Vapenvallen has a total capacity of 4,000 spectators.

References 

Football venues in Sweden
Husqvarna FF
Sport in Huskvarna
Buildings and structures in Jönköping Municipality